Shaye Saint John is a fictional character and art project who appears in a series of surrealist, campy comedy horror short films. Saint John, created by Eric Fournier, was described with a backstory claiming she was a supermodel disfigured in a train accident, who rebuilt her body with a collection of mannequin parts.

Shaye Saint John
The character of Shaye Saint John is described as a "model", and is shown in videos wearing a plastic mask, a series of wigs and dresses, and manipulating wooden hands on sticks. She is described as having been hit by a train which resulted in the loss of her arms and legs. Instead of using prosthetics, she added mannequin parts to her face and added wooden hands so no one could see her badly deformed hands.
Saint John wears a series of masks throughout her videos, supposedly because she doesn't want anyone to see what she really looks like. Creator Eric Fournier has said "It's really bad, that's why she wears the mask".

In 2003, the character started a blog at LiveJournal. A YouTube channel named Elastic Spastic Plastic Fantastic was created on 30 August 2006 and uploaded all 56 of the "Shaye" videos in 2006–2007. The official channel was terminated by YouTube on December 22, 2017, but reupload channels still exist.

Eric Fournier

Eric Fournier was born in Bloomington, Indiana in 1969. In the 1990s, Fournier was a member of punk bands The Blood Farmers and Skelegore when he began working on the first Shaye Saint John film, 'Strange Dolly'. In 1999, he packaged 30 of the videos together on a DVD titled The Triggers Compilation on which he was credited as the director, writer, editor and producer.

On February 25, 2010, Fournier died, aged 42, at a Palm Springs hospital from alcoholism-induced internal bleeding.

Eric and Shaye
Documentary director Larry Wessel started a Kickstarter campaign for a documentary film about Shaye Saint John and the personal life of the character's creator Eric Fournier, titled Eric and Shaye. The documentary premiered in October 2016.

References

External links
 
Shaye Saint John Website
 Shaye Saint John on LiveJournal
 Shaye Saint John archive
 Video Mirror

Internet memes
Fictional models
Fictional amputees
Film characters introduced in 1999